Aisihaiti (disappeared 1968) was a Chinese communist politician of Tatar ethnicity active in Xinjiang.

Aisihaiti was one of a number of high ranking officials formerly affiliated with the Ili Rebellion who joined the Communist Party of China following the 1949 incorporation of Xinjiang into the People's Republic of China. In 1954, he was elected to the 1st National People's Congress. He served as Vice-Chairman of the government of the Xinjiang Autonomous Province from August 1956 to September 1968. Aisihaiti disappeared and was likely killed during the Cultural Revolution of 1968.

References 

Victims of the Cultural Revolution
Chinese Tatars
20th century in Xinjiang
Tatar people
Chinese Muslims
Chinese people of Tatar descent
Delegates to the 1st National People's Congress